The International Association of Bridge, Structural, Ornamental and Reinforcing Iron Workers is a union in the United States and Canada, which represents, trains and protects primarily construction workers, as well as shipbuilding and metal fabrication employees.

Origins 
The union was formed on February 4, 1896 at a meeting in Pittsburgh, Pennsylvania with 16 delegates from the local unions in Boston, Massachusetts, Buffalo, New York, Chicago, Illinois, Cleveland, Ohio, New York City, New York, Detroit, Michigan, Philadelphia, Pennsylvania and Pittsburgh. Those locals, and others established later, often protected their own autonomy jealously, rejecting at least one national contract with the American Bridge Company because it would have reduced their power. The internal divisions also led the union, which had affiliated with the American Federation of Labor shortly after its formation, to disaffiliate in 1901, only to reaffiliate two years later. It was one of the charter members of the AFL's Building Trades Department, which was created in 1908.

History of iron work
Iron work is a skilled craft that dates back to the late 19th century and is a result of the rapid rise in the use of modern steel in iron bridges and skyscrapers.  It was and is also an exceptionally dangerous job; hundreds of iron workers fell to their death every year in the late years of the nineteenth century. As one saying among Iron Workers of the day put it, "We're killed, but we seldom ever die."

Battles with employers 
A number of employers tried to destroy the craft unions that made up the AFL in the first decade of the twentieth century by insisting on maintaining an "open shop", i.e. hiring without reference to union membership. For craft unions, such as the Iron Workers, who maintained union wages and working conditions by controlling the supply of labor, the open shop meant that the employer was free to set any wage standards it chose and to discriminate against union members in hiring.

The Iron Workers had successfully repelled the open shop demands of American Bridge Company (or "Ambridge"), an arm of the United States Steel Corporation, in 1903. In 1905, after the union's collective bargaining agreement with Ambridge had expired, Ambridge and the other members of the National Erectors Association began refusing to hire union members and hired labor spies to infiltrate the union. When the Iron Workers struck in response, the employers obtained injunctions and local ordinances that barred picketing or limited it to an ineffective display. Open shop demands still exist today. Non-union iron-working companies are in competition to take over union jobs, but the non-union hourly wage is based on the union rate.

Los Angeles Times bombing
Between the years of 1908 and 1911, 87 to 150 bombings took place at work sites, including some bombs set up by union members. The most famous one, and the only one to cause any loss of life, killed twenty employees of the Los Angeles Times on October 1, 1910. Times publisher  Harrison Gray Otis was a staunch opponent of labor unions, and the main supporter for the open shop movement in Los Angeles. Authorities arrested James B. McNamara and Ortie McManigal in Detroit, carrying dynamite in a suitcase. Both men were in positions of importance in the Ironworkers Union. McManigal confessed to a number of dynamite bombings, and named the Secretary-Treasurer of the union, John J. McNamara, as the man who directed the bombings. James and Jim McNamara were brothers, and John gave James $1,000 per month from the union's treasury to finance the bombings.

The union hired famed attorney Clarence Darrow to defend the McNamaras. Darrow, however, concluded that the brothers faced a strong chance of receiving the death penalty for the crime. Darrow therefore made a clumsy attempt, in broad daylight in downtown Los Angeles, to bribe one of the jurors. As it turned out, it was a trap and Darrow was arrested. Now more desperate than ever, he persuaded the McNamaras to plead guilty on the basis of an unwritten plea bargain that would have freed John. Once they pleaded guilty, however, the authorities denied that they had any deal at all. John McNamara served nearly ten years, while his brother spent his remaining years in prison.

Their guilty pleas effectively defeated the campaign of Job Harriman, then running for mayor of Los Angeles as a socialist, and nearly destroyed Darrow's career and reputation. The federal government then indicted dozens of other Iron Worker officers for conspiring to transport dynamite as part of this campaign; the International's current President, Frank M. Ryan, and one of its future Presidents, Paul "Paddy" Morrin, were convicted along with several other defendants on December 31, 1912, after a trial in which Herbert Hockin, the International Secretary-Treasurer, testified against them.

John J. McNamara later returned to the union after his release from state prison. He was expelled from the union in 1928, however, for submitting false audit reports on behalf of his local union.

In 2006, Journalist Robert Fitch described the Ironworkers Union bombings as perhaps the largest domestic terrorism campaign in American history, and further notes the Los Angeles Times bombing and subsequent trials as marked a precipitous decline in labor union power in the Los Angeles area.

Battles with the AFL, employers and the IWW
The Iron Workers soon found themselves at war with the AFL and, in particular, the United Brotherhood of Carpenters and Joiners of America. The Carpenters claimed that pile-driving work, which was done primarily by Iron Workers in many areas, belonged to them and convinced the Building Trades Department to go along with them. When the Iron Workers refused to relinquish this work the AFL suspended it from membership in 1917. Other unions, such as the Lathers, then claimed that work that had historically been done by iron workers belonged to them instead. Unable to call on the support of other AFL unions in its fights with employers, the Iron Workers relented the following year and ceded pile driving work, with the exception of work related to bridge building, to the Carpenters.

These fissures contributed to an extent to the failure of the Iron Workers' New York City strike, called in 1921 to resist the American Plan, the open shop movement that reversed much of the labor movement's gains, particularly in construction, of the previous decade. When the strike failed, the union sued the employers, also without success. The union survived, but in a much weaker state.

The union also fought the Industrial Workers of the World, which had won leadership in a number of its west coast locals in the era after World War I. International President Morrin expelled some dissident locals and sued others to regain the locals' property. By 1928 the rebellion was over.

The Great Depression and the New Deal
The union lost roughly half of its members in the early 1930s. While the passage of the Davis–Bacon Act required payment of the prevailing wage on federal construction projects, the desperate shortage of work allowed some employers to force their employees to pay kickbacks to them to hold on to their jobs. A number of union members hopped freight cars to go in search for work. At the same time the union's old enemy, the Carpenters union, resumed its jurisdictional war with it.

Conditions improved somewhat with the advent of the New Deal and the Roosevelt administration's creation of the Works Progress Administration, a public works project that employed thousands of iron workers and other construction workers. The union was also spurred to organize, particularly in the inside fabricating shops, by the threat of competition from the newly created Congress of Industrial Organizations. The union's membership grew slowly, reaching 40,000 by 1940.

World War II, the postwar boom and change

The union grew even more rapidly during World War II and the years afterward, reaching 100,000 members by 1948, when John H. Lyons succeeded Morrin as president of the union. His son, John H. Lyons, Jr., succeeded him in 1961.

The Taft-Hartley Act, passed in 1947, limited construction unions' rights to picket worksites at which non-union contractors were working by barring secondary boycotts. Even with those restrictions, however, the Iron Workers continued to grow in the expansive economy of the 1950s.

The union, like most other United States construction unions, had remained nearly all-white for most of its history. That began to change in the early 1960s, as the American civil rights movement began to challenge employment discrimination in the north, then picked up steam in the 1970s as the federal government began using the Civil Rights Act of 1964 to knock down some of the barriers to African-American workers' entry into the industry. Some local unions of the Iron Workers fought integration and affirmative action tenaciously, but usually unsuccessfully.

The union also found itself challenged by a change in the business climate in the 1970s, as non-union contractors invaded markets that had been solidly union for years with the support of the Business Roundtable, made up of the heads of General Motors, General Electric, Exxon, U.S. Steel, DuPont and others. The Roundtable also attempted to weaken the Davis-Bacon Act and other legislation that protected construction workers. The Iron Workers and other building trades, caught off guard and used to organizing from the top down, lost large amounts of work to non-union contractors in the decades that followed.

Twenty-first century controversies
The union's International President, Jake West, pleaded guilty in 2002 to improper use of pension funds and making a false statement on a union report filed with the United States Department of Labor.  Joseph Hunt succeeded him.  A number of lower-level officers and the union's accounting firm likewise pleaded guilty to related embezzlement and disclosure charges. Fitch described West's guilty plea as part of a pattern of corruption in the Ironworkers, as he was one of "nine top officials" investigated or indicted for crimes between 1999 and 2002.

Composition
According to the union's Department of Labor records since 2005, the union has reported several types of membership classifications, with the majority eligible to vote in the union, and (overall average for the period) 12% ineligible to vote. Throughout the period, "journeymen" have been the largest category (period average of 56%), followed by "lifetime honorary" members (period average 16%), followed by "apprentices" and "shopmen" (period average 9% each).

As of 2014 the number of members in each of these categories are about 21,000 "lifetime honorary" members (17% of total), 12,000 "apprentices" (9%), 11,000 "shopmen" (9%), 8,000 "honorary" members (6%), 2,000 "probationary" members (2%), 1,000 "retired shopmen" (1%), 1,000 "trainees" (1%), 322 "riggers" (<1%), 120 "military" members (<1%) and 15 "navy retirees" (<1%), plus 3 non-members paying agency fees, compared to about 67,000 "journeymen" (54%). Members classified as "apprentices," "probationary," "trainees," "retired shopmen" and "navy retirees" are ineligible to vote in the union.

District Councils

 Canada
 Ontario
 Eastern Canada
 Western Canada
 United States
 Chicago and Vicinity
 Mid-Atlantic States
 New England States
 New York State
 North Central States
 Northern Ohio, Western Pennsylvania and Northern West Virginia
 Southern Ohio and Vicinity
 Pacific Northwest
 Philadelphia and Vicinity
 Regional (Florida)
 Rocky Mountain Area
 Southeastern States
 St. Louis and Vicinity
 Tennessee Valley and Vicinity
 Texas and the Mid-South States
 State of California and Vicinity

Presidents
1896: Edward Ryan
1899: John Butler
1901: Frank Buchanan
1905: Frank Ryan
1914: James McClory
1918: Paddy Morrin
1948: John H. Lyons
1961: John H. Lyons, Jr.
1987: Juel Drake
1991: Jake West
2001: Joseph J. Hunt
2010: Walter Wise
2015: Eric Dea

Local unions

 Canada
 Alberta
 Local 720 – Edmonton
 Local 725 – Calgary
 Local 805 – Calgary
 British Columbia
 Local 97 – Burnaby
 Local 643 – Victoria
 Local 712 – Vancouver
 Manitoba
 Local 728 – Winnipeg
 New Brunswick
 Local 809 – St. John
 Local 842 – St. John
 Newfoundland
 Local 764 – St. Johns
 Nova Scotia
 Local 752 – Halifax
 Ontario
 Local 700 – Windsor
 Local 721 – Toronto
 Local 736 – Hamilton
 Local 759 – Thunder Bay
 Local 765 – Ottawa
 Local 786 – Sudbury
 Local 834 – Toronto
 Quebec
 Local 711 – Montreal
 Saskatchewan
 Local 771 – Regina
 Local 838 – Regina
 United States
 Alabama
 Local 92 – Birmingham
 Local 477 – Sheffield
 Local 798 – Mobile
 Alaska
 Local 751 – Anchorage
 Arizona
 Local 75 – Phoenix
 Local 847 – Phoenix
 Arkansas
 Local 321 – Little Rock
 California
 Local 118 – Sacramento
 Local 155 – Fresno
 Local 229 – San Diego
 Local 377 – San Francisco
 Local 378 – Oakland
 Local 416 – Los Angeles/Las Vegas
 Local 433 – Los Angeles/Las Vegas
 Local 509 – Los Angeles
 Local 624 – Fresno
 Local 790 – San Francisco/Oakland
 Local 844 – Hercules
 Colorado
 Local 24 – Denver
 Connecticut
 Local 15 – Hartford
 Local 424 – New Haven
 Local 832 – Meriden
 Delaware
 Local 451 – Wilmington
 District of Columbia
 Local 5 – Washington
 Local 201 – Washington
 Florida
 Local 272 – Miami
 Local 397 – Tampa
 Local 402 – West Palm Beach
 Local 597 – Jacksonville
 Local 698 – Miami
 Local 808 – Orlando
 Local 846 – Lakeland
 Georgia
 Local 387 – Atlanta
 Local 709 – Savannah
 Hawaii
 Local 625 – Honolulu
 Local 742 – Honolulu
 Local 803 – Honolulu
 Idaho
 Local 732 – Pocatello
 Illinois
 Local 1 – Chicago
 Local 46 – Springfield
 Local 63 – Chicago
 Local 111 – Rock Island
 Local 112 – Peoria
 Local 136 – Chicago
 Local 380 – Champaign
 Local 392 – East St. Louis
 Local 393 – Aurora
 Local 444 – Joliet
 Local 473 – Chicago
 Local 498 – Rockford
 Local 590 – Aurora
 Indiana
 Local 22 – Indianapolis
 Local 103 – Evansville
 Local 147 – Ft. Wayne
 Local 292 – South Bend
 Local 395 – Hammond
 Local 585 – Vincennes
 Local 726 – Ft. Wayne
 Iowa
 Local 67 – Des Moines
 Local 89 – Cedar Rapids
 Local 493 – Des Moines
 Local 577 – Burlington
 Kentucky
 Local 70 – Louisville
 Local 769 – Ashland
 Local 782 – Paducah
 Louisiana
 Local 58 – New Orleans
 Local 623 – Baton Rouge
 Maine
 Local 807 – Winslow
 Maryland
 Local 16 – Baltimore
 Local 568 – Cumberland
 Massachusetts
 Local 7 – Boston
 Local 501 – Boston
 Michigan
 Local 25 – Detroit
 Local 340 – Battle Creek
 Local 508 – Detroit
 Local 831 – Wayne
 Minnesota
 Local 512 – Minneapolis/St. Paul
 Local 535 – Minneapolis/St. Paul
 Missouri
 Local 10 – Kansas City
 Local 396 – St. Louis
 Local 518 – St. Louis
 Local 520 – Kansas City
 Mississippi
 Local 469 – Jackson
 Nebraska
 Local 21 – Omaha
 Local 553 – Omaha
 New Hampshire
 Local 745 – Portsmouth
 New Jersey
 Local 11 – Newark
 Local 68 – Trenton
 Local 350 – Atlantic City
 Local 399 – Camden
 New Mexico
 Local 495 – Albuquerque
 New York
 Local 6 – Buffalo
 Local 9 – Niagara Falls
 Local 12 – Albany
 Local 33 – Rochester
 Local 40 – New York
 Local 46L – New York
 Local 60 – Syracuse
 Local 197 – New York
 Local 361 – Brooklyn
 Local 417 – Newburgh
 Local 440 – Utica
 Local 470 – Jamestown
 Local 576 – Buffalo
 Local 580 – New York
 Local 612 – Syracuse
 Local 824 – Gouverneur
 North Carolina
 Local 812 – Asheville
 Ohio
 Local 17 – Cleveland
 Local 44 – Cincinnati
 Local 55 – Toledo
 Local 172 – Columbus
 Local 207 – Youngstown
 Local 290 – Dayton
 Local 372 – Cincinnati
 Local 468 – Cleveland
 Local 499 – Toledo
 Local 522 – Cincinnati
 Local 550 – Canton
 Oklahoma
 Local 48 – Oklahoma City
 Local 584 – Tulsa
 Oregon
 Local 29 – Portland
 Local 516 – Portland
 Pennsylvania
 Local 3 – Pittsburgh
 Local 36 – Easton
 Local 401 – Philadelphia
 Local 404 – Harrisburg
 Local 405 – Philadelphia
 Local 420 – Reading
 Local 489 – Scranton
 Local 502 – Philadelphia
 Local 521 – Scranton
 Local 527 – Pittsburgh
 Rhode Island
 Local 37 – Providence
 Local 523 – Pawtucket
 South Carolina
 Local 848 – Charleston
 Tennessee
 Local 167 – Memphis
 Local 384 – Knoxville
 Local 492 – Nashville
 Local 526 – Chattanooga
 Local 704 – Chattanooga
 Texas
 Local 66 – San Antonio
 Local 84 – Houston
 Local 135 – Galveston
 Local 263 – Dallas/Ft. Worth
 Local 482 – Austin
 Local 536 – Dallas
 Utah
 Local 27 – Salt Lake City
 Virginia
 Local 28 – Richmond
 Local 228 – Portsmouth
 Local 79 – Norfolk
 Washington
 Local 14 – Spokane
 Local 86 – Seattle
 Local 506 – Seattle
 West Virginia
 Local 301 – Charleston
 Local 549 – Wheeling
 Local 787 – Parkersburg
 Wisconsin
 Local 8 – Milwaukee
 Local 383 – Madison
 Local 665 – Madison
 Local 811 – Wausau
 Local 825 – La Crosse
 Local 849 – Luck

References

External links

 
 Ironworker Management Progressive Action Cooperative Trust (IMPACT) Ironworkers Labor-Management Trust official site.
 Iron Workers' semi-official history of the union

AFL–CIO
Canadian Labour Congress
Building and construction trade unions
Trade unions established in 1896
Ironworkers